Anne Keothavong was the defending champion, but competed in Montreal at the same week.

Urszula Radwańska won the title by defeating Julie Coin 2–6, 6–3, 7–5 in the final.

Seeds

Draw

Finals

Top half

Bottom half

References
 Main Draw (ITF)
 Qualifying Draw (ITF)

Odlum Brown Vancouver Open – Women's Singles
Vancouver Open